Nordstraße is an underground station on the Düsseldorf Stadtbahn lines U78 and U79 in Düsseldorf. The station lies on Nordstraße in the district of Pempelfort.

The station was opened on October 3, 1981, and consists of one island platform with two rail tracks. On the surface interchange to Tram lines 701 and 705 is possible.

In 2003, a 50-year-old man drove his car into the entrance of the station on street level (without going all the way in) when he thought it was entrance to a car park. Likewise, in 2007, a 52-year-old woman drove her car into the entrance staircase, also thinking it would lead to a car park.

References

External links 

 

Düsseldorf VRR stations
Railway stations in Germany opened in 1981